Youes Akbarpour (Persian یونس اکبرپور) is an Iranian footballer who currently plays for Iranian football club Aluminium Arak F.C. in the Persian Gulf Pro League.

Club career 
In 2019_2020, he started playing professional football in F.C. Pars Jonoubi Jam football team In the 2021 season, he joined Mes Rafsanjanfootball team and after one season, he joined Aluminum Arak football team and is currently in this team.

References 

2002 births
Living people
Iranian footballers
Aluminium Arak players